It's All Over but the Crying may refer to:
 "It's All Over but the Crying", a 1947 song by The Ink Spots
 "All Over But the Cryin'", a song by The Georgia Satellites from their 1989 album In the Land of Salvation and Sin
 "It's All Over but the Crying", a song by Garbage from their 2005 album Bleed Like Me